Them is an American horror anthology series, created by Little Marvin and executive produced by Lena Waithe. The series stars Deborah Ayorinde, Ashley Thomas, Alison Pill, and Ryan Kwanten and premiered on Amazon Prime Video on April 9, 2021, to mixed reviews. A second season, titled Them: The Scare, is in development, with Ayorinde returning from the first season.

Premise
Set in 1953, Them follows a black family who, during the Second Great Migration, moves from North Carolina to an all-white neighborhood in Los Angeles. The family's idyllic home slowly transforms into an epicenter of evil forces, next-door and otherworldly, that threaten to haunt, ravage and destroy them.

Cast and characters

Main
 Deborah Ayorinde as Livia "Lucky" Emory
 Ashley Thomas as Henry Emory
 Alison Pill as Elizabeth "Betty" Wendell
 Shahadi Wright Joseph as Ruby Lee Emory
 Melody Hurd as Gracie Emory
 Ryan Kwanten as George Bell

Guest
 Dale Dickey as The Woman
 Liam McIntyre as Clarke Wendell
 Lindsey Kraft as Midge Pruitt
 Pat Healy as Marty Dixon
 Brooke Smith as Helen Koistra
 Malcolm Mays as Calvin
 John Patrick Jordan as Earl 
 Dirk Rogers as Miss Vera
 Abbie Cobb as Nat Dixon
 Max Barsness as Dale Pruitt
 Kim Shaw as Carol Lynn Denton
 Bailey Noble as Marlene
 Derek Phillips as Sergeant Bull Wheatley
 P.J. Byrne as Stuart Berks
 Sophie Guest as Doris
 Tim Russ as The Custodian
 Ryan Kennedy as Gary
 Christopher Heyerdahl as The Black Hat Man
 Jeremiah Birkett as Da Tap Dance Man
 Paula Jai Parker as Hazel Emory
 Sheria Irving as Cynthia
 J. Mallory McCree as Junius Emory
 Anika Noni Rose as Ella Mae
 Roland Johnson as Moe Irvin
 Lisa Banes as Esther Haber (Banes' final television role before her death on June 14, 2021)
 Michael Harney as Otto Haber
 Peter Mackenzie as Mr. Stoal
 Shaw Jones as City Planner
 Van Epperson as Banker
 Barry Livingston as Real Estate Commissioner
 David Bowe as Mitch
 Christopher Murray as Murray
 Daniel Robbins as Man In Car
 Scott Alan Smith as Fuller
 Latarsha Rose as Arnette Beaumont
 Samantha Sherman as Marjorie Wallinger
 Kate McNeil as Dr. Frances Moynihan
 Dominic Burgess as Roger
 Nona Parker Johnson
 Cranston Johnson
 Melinda Page Hamilton as Elder Sara
 Gene Silvers as Elder Luther
 J. Paul Boehmer as Elder James
 Summera Howell as Elder Cora
 Kai Richard as Miles

Episodes

Season 1: Covenant (2021)

Production

Development
On July 28, 2018, Amazon gave the project a two-season order. The series was created by Little Marvin, who also wrote the script for the first season and was set to executive produce the show alongside Lena Waithe under their overall deals with Amazon Studios. Roy Lee, Miri Yoon, and Michael Connolly of Vertigo Entertainment were also announced as executive producers, with Vertigo co-producing the series under the company's deal with Sony Pictures Television. The first season is subtitled Them: Covenant, and the series will follow a similar limited semi-anthological structure to American Horror Story, with each season following a different story with different characters. Alongside the series order announcement, Waithe said:

On April 1, 2019, David Matthews joined the series as showrunner under his newly announced overall deal at Sony Pictures Television. On November 19, 2019, it was announced that Larysa Kondracki was attached to executive produce the series as well as direct multiple episodes including the pilot under her overall deal at Amazon Studios.

Casting
On July 27, 2019, Deborah Ayorinde and Ashley Thomas were cast in the lead roles. Shahadi Wright Joseph, Alison Pill, Ryan Kwanten, Melody Hurd, Javier Botet, and Percy Hynes White were added to the main cast on October 3, 2019, alongside Derek Phillips who was cast in a recurring capacity. On December 2, 2019, Brooke Smith, Anika Noni Rose P.J. Byrne, Malcolm Mays, Jeremiah Birkett, and Sophie Guest joined the recurring cast.

Filming
The series began production on July 8, 2019, with filming taking place between Atlanta and Los Angeles.

The set for the neighborhood was built on a lot in Pomona, California.

Release
The series had its world premiere on March 18, 2021, at the SXSW Film Festival as part of the Episodic Premieres section. The series premiered on Amazon Prime Video on April 9, 2021.

Reception
On review aggregator Rotten Tomatoes, the series has a 59% fresh rating from 49 critic reviews with an average score of 6.5/10. The site's critical consensus reads "Deborah Ayorinde and Ashley Thomas' gripping performances help Them sustain a sufficient sense of terror, but its blunt and bloody approach undermines any social commentary in favor of more superficial horrors." On Metacritic, the series received a mixed rating of 57/100 based on 20 critic reviews.

The Guardians Lucy Mangan gave the show 4/5 stars, writing that "What marks out this portrayal of 50s prejudice (not unworked ground) is that, thanks to magnificent performances from Thomas and Ayorinde, you get a great sense of the cost to victims: the sheer amount of mental energy it takes to navigate a relentlessly hostile world, the consequent exhaustion, the constant abrading of the soul."

In a mostly negative review, Lovia Gyarkye of The Hollywood Reporter said that "Them suffers from an overcrowded narrative and too many themes, making for an uneven, dizzying, at times overly dense viewing experience. From the violent neighbors and the history of Black homeownership to the traumas that plague each member of the Emory family, the show takes on more than it can responsibly unpack."

Varietys chief TV critic Daniel D'Addario wrote that "In visual style and in the performances of the actors playing the Emorys, it captures a recognizable 1950s of the mind. A striking early sequence sees the family in integrated settings, being assisted by white employees at an appliance store and a soda fountain. The point is made, elegantly, that the Emorys have left behind the explicit bigotry of the American South for a place where the horrors are more insidious", but described the series as "surprisingly unimaginative".

Some critics took issue with scenes of graphic racial violence, particularly a scene in which a Black couple is blinded with hot pokers and burned alive, calling Them "black trauma porn".

Awards and nominations

Notes

See also
Get Out - Oscar-winning Jordan Peele film similar in content
Suburbicon - George Clooney film also similar in content
United States in the 1950s

References

External links
 
 

2020s American anthology television series
2020s American drama television series
2020s American horror television series
2021 American television series debuts
American horror fiction television series
English-language television shows
Amazon Prime Video original programming
Racism in television
Television series by Amazon Studios
Television series by Sony Pictures Television
Television series by Vertigo Entertainment
Television series set in 1953
Television shows filmed in Atlanta
Television shows filmed in Los Angeles
Television shows set in Los Angeles
Television series set in the 1950s